Camden is a town in Oneida County, New York, United States.  The population was 4,934 at the 2010 census.

The town of Camden contains a village also called Camden. The town is in the northwestern part of Oneida County and is northwest of the City of Rome.

History 

The first settlement took place circa 1792. The town was formed from the Town of Mexico in 1799. Camden is home to International Wire, which is its largest employer. The town has only two stop lights, with the second one installed in 1999.

The population of Camden in 1800 was 354.

Geography

The town is north-northwest of Oneida Lake. The western town line is the border of Oswego County.

Climate

According to the Köppen Climate Classification system, Camden has a warm-summer humid continental climate, abbreviated "Dfb" on climate maps.

Demographics

As of the census of 2000, there were 5,028 people, 1,881 households, and 1,346 families residing in the town.  The population density was 93.1 people per square mile (35.9/km2).  There were 2,020 housing units at an average density of 37.4 per square mile (14.4/km2).  The racial makeup of the town was 98.11% White, 0.38% Black or African American, 0.18% Native American, 0.44% Asian, 0.20% from other races, and 0.70% from two or more races. Hispanic or Latino of any race were 0.80% of the population.

There were 1,881 households, out of which 35.4% had children under the age of 18 living with them, 56.5% were married couples living together, 9.4% had a female householder with no husband present, and 28.4% were non-families. 24.1% of all households were made up of individuals, and 10.5% had someone living alone who was 65 years of age or older.  The average household size was 2.63 and the average family size was 3.09.

In the town, the population was spread out, with 27.2% under the age of 18, 7.4% from 18 to 24, 28.0% from 25 to 44, 24.2% from 45 to 64, and 13.2% who were 65 years of age or older.  The median age was 37 years. For every 100 females, there were 100.7 males.  For every 100 females age 18 and over, there were 96.1 males.

The median income for a household in the town was $39,035, and the median income for a family was $44,402. Males had a median income of $31,940 versus $22,730 for females. The per capita income for the town was $18,644.  About 9.5% of families and 12.1% of the population were below the poverty line, including 13.5% of those under age 18 and 17.7% of those age 65 or over.

Schools 
The Camden school district is the second largest geographically in New York state.  It includes not only the town of Camden itself, but also part or all of the towns of Annsville, Florence, Osceola, and Vienna.

Elementary students in the Camden school district attend one of two schools: 
Camden Elementary in the village of Camden, and
McConnellsville Elementary in the town of Vienna.

All of these students proceed to middle and Camden High School.

Forest Park
Location: Forest Park is located in Camden, off Route 13. The park starts at Ripley Drive and continues to complete a 1.75 mile lap. Emmons Brook and Cob Brook run through the park. The park is closed to everyone except skiers during the winter due to the paths being stocked with snow. Forest Park also contains an apartment building and a cemetery.

History: Forest Park was once owned and named after Mr. Alva Raymond. Before the park was owned by Raymond, the woodland area belonged to the Ransom Estate and before that it was owned by Mr Daniel Parke; both were pioneers in Camden's development. The first purchase of the park consisted of sixty-two acres in 1891. The second purchase in 1897 consisted of forty acres. The price as a whole ultimately totaled twenty-four hundred dollars. The park now consists of 117 acres and has many more pavilions.

Attractions: Most of Camden's residents visit the park during the spring and summer months. The park is an area for many leisure activities “this 117 acre park is known for its miles of paved roads for walking, jogging, and biking”. The park is also  home to summer picnics, family reunions and is also a hot spot for photographers. Many graduation parties and church events are held at the park as well.

Forest Park Cemetery: Forest Park Cemetery is located about a half of a mile south of Camden across from Oneida Savings Bank. Mrs. Clarissa Ranson and her husband bought the first plot in 1840. There has been a record kept of all burials in the cemetery since 1845. Many of the bodies were transferred from old Protestant cemeteries in 1876.

Communities and locations in the Town of Camden 
Camden – The Village of Camden is at the junction of NY 13 and NY 69.
Hillsboro – A hamlet west of Camden village.
Preston Hill – A location south of Camden village.
Westdale – A hamlet in the northwestern part of the town.

Notable People
Todd Gordon, former NASCAR crew chief and radio announcer.
Lynn Lovenguth, baseball player.

References

External links
  Camden History Video
  Camden information
  Information about Camden, NY - The Queen Village
 History of Camden, NY

Utica–Rome metropolitan area
Towns in Oneida County, New York